Empusa may refer to:
 In ancient Greek mythology, the Empusa (or Empousa) was a female supernatural monster or demoness
 Empusa, a 2010 movie co-starring Paul Naschy, made in Spain
 Empusa (mantis), a genus of mantises in the family Empusidae
 Empusa (moth), a synonym of the moth genus Cucullia in the family Noctuidae
 Empusa (plant), a genus of plants in the family Orchidaceae
 Empusa muscae, a synonym for Entomophthora muscae, a fungal parasite of flies